Georgetown (also known as Mixer) is an unincorporated community in Clark Township, Pope County, Arkansas, United States.

References

Unincorporated communities in Pope County, Arkansas
Unincorporated communities in Arkansas